This is a list of sieges, land and naval battles of the War of the Second Coalition (1798/9 – 1801/2, depending on periodisation). It includes the battles of:
 the French campaign in Egypt and Syria (July 1799 – September 1801);
 the Naples campaign in central and southern Italy (November 1798 – January 1799);
 the Sanfedisti campaign in central and southern Italy (February–June 1799);
 the Austro–Russian expedition in Italy and Switzerland (April–December 1799);
 the Anglo-Russian invasion of Holland (August–November 1799);
 the Marengo campaign in northern Italy (April–June 1800);
 the Danube campaign in southern Germany (May–June 1800);
 the Hohenlinden campaign in Bavaria (November–December 1800);
 the War of the Oranges in Portugal (May–June 1801);
 overseas naval or colonial battles (insofar these were not part of the Haitian Revolution or East Indies theatre); and 
 insurrections in Paris that overtook or threatened to overtake the central government.
It does not include battles from the Haitian Revolution (1791–1804), nor the East Indies theatre of the French Revolutionary Wars (1793–1801), nor the Chouannerie (1794–1800), nor the Anglo-Spanish War (1796–1808) (including the 1801 Algeciras campaign), nor the French invasion of Switzerland (January–May 1798), nor the Irish Rebellion of 1798, nor Mediterranean campaign of 1798, nor the Peasants' War (1798), nor the Quasi-War (1798–1800), nor the Stecklikrieg (1802), as these did not involve the Second Coalition as such.

See also 
 List of battles of the War of the First Coalition (20 April 1792 – 18 October 1797)
 List of battles of the War of the Third Coalition (1803/1805–1805/1806)
 List of battles of the War of the Fourth Coalition (9 October 1806 – 9 July 1807)
 List of battles of the War of the Fifth Coalition (10 April – 14 October 1809)
 List of battles of the War of the Sixth Coalition (3 March 1813 – 30 May 1814)
 List of battles of the Hundred Days (War of the Seventh Coalition) (15/20 March – 8 July / 16 August 1815)

Notes

References 

Second Coalition